is a dating sim developed and published by Konami and the second game in the Tokimeki Memorial series.

Tokimeki Memorial 2 was released for the PlayStation in 1999.  It came on 5 CDs, featuring unmatched graphics and voice acting and a groundbreaking "Emotional Voice System (EVS)" where the girls could pronounce the player's name.  Only Hikari Hinamoto and Kasumi Asou have the ability to use the EVS system in the actual game. All the other girls' EVS data came on CDs that were free in the Tokimeki Memorial 2 magazine "Hibikino Watcher". Each of the first three magazines came with a CD which had three of the girl's data on it per CD (the chosen girls on the CDs were also the three girls on the corresponding magazine cover). All the girls from the game have EVS data with the exception of Maeka Kudanshita, who always refers to the main player as "Shounen" (Japanese for young lad). The game itself was a big hit in Japan.  Its gameplay followed the same template as the first, but with a lesser emphasis on the bombs and a greater emphasis on solving unique challenges specific to each girl.  As a result, a different strategy had to be devised for every playthrough.

The game and EVS Append Disc was released in Japan for the PlayStation Store on November 25, 2009, exactly ten years after the game's original release date.

Characters

Voiced by Junko Noda
The main heroine of the game. She was the player's best friend until he moved away when he was 8. She is kind, cheerful, and energetic.

Voiced by Mami Kosuge
Hikari's best friend. She is an intelligent, serious person and is strongly opposed to Western influences.

Voiced by Misa Torii
Hikari and the player's older sister figure when they were kids. She joins Hibikino High as the player's home room teacher in the second year.

Voiced by Naoko Takano
A cheerful girl with a very long streak of bad luck.

Voiced by Hikari Tachibana
A polite, sweet girl who loves frogs and fortune telling. People occasionally come to her to have their fortunes told.

Voiced by Kazusa Murai
A quiet, sad girl one year older than the player. She is often seen on the school's rooftop alone.

Voiced by Chiaki Maeda
The klutzy, slightly chubby manager of the Hibikino High baseball team.

Voiced by Yukari Tamura)
 The little sister of Rei Ijyuin from the first game. She becomes a student in the beginning of the second year. She is very haughty and, until the player gets to know her better, never seen without her butler.

Voiced by Mayumi Nomura
A cheerful, poor girl who works a part-time job as a waitress to pay her way through school.

Voiced by Motoko Kumai
An energetic tomboy who loves video games and anime. She is good friends with Akane and the school principal.

Voiced by Hikari Tachibana
Miho's twin sister who goes to Kirameki High. She looks like her sister except for her bigger breasts.

Voiced by Emi Motoi
A talented circus performer who travels with her father. She doesn't have many friends.

Voiced by Miho Yamada
A delivery girl who's good friends with Kasumi.

Voiced by Yuki Masuda
The information otaku of the school. He will give the player the girls' phone numbers, as well as basic information on them.

Voiced by Kenji Nojima
A friend of Takumi who practices kendo and is shy around women. In the Drama CDs, he has a crush on Kaedeko.

Reception
On release, Famitsu magazine scored the game a 33 out of 40. The game sold 370,000 copies within six months.

Board game 
A board game based on the video game, Tokimeki Memorial 2: Game of Life (Jinsei Game), was published by Takara on February 11, 2000 in Japan.

References

External links
 Official site

1999 video games
Konami games
Japan-exclusive video games
Mobile games
PlayStation (console) games
PlayStation Network games
Tokimeki Memorial
Video games developed in Japan